The following is a timeline of the history of Guatemala City, Republic of Guatemala.

Prior to 20th century

 1776 – Nueva Guatemala de la Asuncion founded, following destruction by earthquake of former Spanish colonial capital Antigua.
 1778 – Population: 10,841.
 1779 – City becomes capital of Spanish colonial Captaincy General of Guatemala.
 1789 – Plaza Mayor fountain erected.
 1793 – Consulado (merchant guild) established.
 1813 – Cathedral of Guatemala City inaugurated.
 1823 – City becomes part of the United Provinces of Central America.
 1831 – Sociedad Economica museum established.
 1835 – Capital relocated from Guatemala city to San Salvador.
 1858 – Theatre founded.
 1874 - Earthquake. 
 1879 – Gas street lighting installed.
 1880 – Population: 58,000.
 1882 – Horse streetcar begins operating.
 1885 – Electric street lighting installed.
 1893 – Population: 72,000.
 1898 – National Museum of Archaeology and Ethnology established.

20th century

 1905 - Population: about 97,000.
 1917 – December 17: Earthquake.
 1918 – January 4: Earthquake.
 1921
 Airport built.
 Population: 121,000.
 1924 – Zoo founded.
 1934 – Museo Nacional de Historia y Bellas Artes (museum) opens.
 1935 – Torre del Reformador (tower) and Obelisco (monument) erected.
 1940
 Guatemala Post Office Building constructed.
 Population: 186,000.
 1943 – National Palace rebuilt.
 1949 – Club Social y Deportivo Comunicaciones (football club) formed.
 1950
 Estadio Mateo Flores and Estadio del Ejército (stadiums) open.
 City hosts 1950 Central American and Caribbean Games.
 Population: 284,276.
 1957 – National Library of Guatemala new building opens.
 1966 – Del Valle University of Guatemala founded.
 1971 – Francisco Marroquin University founded.
 1973 – Population: 706,920.
 1975 – Museo Nacional de Arte Moderno "Carlos Mérida" established.
 1976 – February 4: 1976 Guatemala earthquake.
 1978 – National Theatre opens.
 1984 – El Mezquital occupied.
 1990 – Population: 1,675,589 (estimate).
 1991
 Estadio Cementos Progreso (stadium) opens.
 Óscar Berger becomes mayor.
 1996 – Álvaro Arzú becomes President of Guatemala.
 1997 – Tikal Futura shopping mall built.
 1999 – Club Premier hi-rise built.
 2000
 Fritz García Gallont becomes mayor.
 Galileo University founded.
 Domo (arena) built.

21st century

 2001
 City hosts 2001 Central American Games.
 Population: 1,022,001.
 2002 – Museo Miraflores (archaeological museum) founded.
 2004
 Guatemala City Railway Museum inaugurated.
 Álvaro Arzú becomes mayor again.
 2005 – March: Protest against Central American Free Trade Agreement.
 2007
 February 19: Salvadoran congressmen killings discovered near city.
 February 23: Sinkhole collapse.
 2009 – Guatemala National Police Archives headquartered in city.
 2010 – May 30: Sinkhole collapse.
 2012 – July: Teacher unrest over upscaled requirements of studying a University degree to become a teacher in the country.
 2013 – Air pollution in Guatemala City reaches annual mean of 41 PM2.5 and 56 PM10, more than recommended.
 2018 – June: 2018 Volcán de Fuego eruption occurs in vicinity of city.

See also
 Guatemala City history
 Guatemala City metropolitan area
 History of Guatemala

References

This article incorporates information from the Spanish Wikipedia.

Bibliography

Published in the 19th century
 
  (describes the city in 1840)
 
  (includes city directory)

Published in the 20th century
 
  (Annotated list of titles published in Guatemala City, arranged chronologically)

External links

 Items related to Guatemala City, various dates (via Digital Public Library of America)

Timeline
Guatemala
 
Years in Guatemala
Guatemala City